Goethalsia may refer to:

Goethalsia (bird), a formerly recognized genus of birds in the family Trochilidae
Goethalsia (plant), a genus of plants in the family Malvaceae